Fedor Ozep or Fyodor Otsep (Fyodor Aleksandrovich Otsep; February 9, 1895 – June 20, 1949) was a Russian-American film director and screenwriter, born in Moscow. An important early writer on film and film theory, he served as dramaturge for the Mezhrabpomfilm-Rus company and wrote a number of films for directors such as V.I. Pudovkin and Yakov Protazanov before turning to directing in 1926.

Ozep was born into a Jewish merchant family in Moscow; his parents Khonon and Basya Otsep owned an umbrella factory. During the production of The Living Corpse in Germany, he decided to remain and worked throughout Europe during the 1930s, enjoying international acclaim for films including The Murderer Dimitri Karamazov and Amok. With the advent of World War II he moved to Hollywood but was unable to establish a career there, directing only one film. His last two films were made in Canada. He died of a heart attack in Los Angeles in 1949.

Filmography
 The Queen of Spades (1916, dir. Yakov Protazanov), screenwriter
 Metel (1918, dir. Nikolai Malikoff), screenwriter
 Polikushka (1922, dir. Alexander Sanin), screenwriter
 The Cigarette Girl from Mosselprom (1924, dir. Yuri Zhelyabuzhsky), screenwriter
 The Stationmaster (1925, dir. Ivan Moskvin, Yuri Zhelyabuzhsky), screenwriter
 Aelita (1924, dir. Yakov Protazanov), screenwriter
 Miss Mend (1926, dir. Fedor Ozep, Boris Barnet), director and screenwriter
 The Yellow Ticket (1928), director and screenwriter
 The Doll With Millions (1928, dir. Sergei Komarov), screenwriter
 The Living Corpse (1929), director and screenwriter
 The Murderer Dimitri Karamazov (1931), director and screenwriter
There were two versions made at the same time, one in French and one in German, German language film co-director: Erich Engels
 Mirages de Paris (1933), director and screenwriter
 Großstadtnacht (1933), director and screenwriter
Großstadtnacht and Mirages de Paris were two versions of the same film, made at the same time, one in French and one in German
 Amok (1934), director
 A Woman Alone (1936, dir. Eugene Frenke), screenwriter
  (1937), director and screenwriter
 Gibraltar (1938), director
 Princess Tarakanova (1938), director and screenwriter
There were two versions made at the same time, one in French and one in Italian, Italian language film co-director: Mario Soldati
 Three Russian Girls (1943, dir. Fedor Ozep, Henry S. Kesler), director
 Cero en conducta (1945, dir. Fedor Ozep, José María Téllez), director
 The Music Master (Le Père Chopin) (1945), director
 Whispering City (1947), director
 La Forteresse (1947), director
Whispering City and La Forteresse were two versions of the same film, made at the same time, one in English and one in French

References

External links
 
 "The Erased Auteur: Rediscovering Fedor Ozep"

1895 births
1949 deaths
Mass media people from Moscow
People from Moskovsky Uyezd
Russian Jews
Russian film directors
Male screenwriters
Russian male writers
Silent film directors
20th-century Russian screenwriters
20th-century Russian male writers
Emigrants from the Russian Empire to the United States
Russian expatriates in France